King Crimson Live in Hyde Park is a live album by the band King Crimson, released through the King Crimson Collectors' Club in September 2002.

The album documents King Crimson's performance at the Hyde Park Festival of July 5, 1969, held in London, England. It has been estimated that half a million people attended this outdoor concert, which was headlined by the Rolling Stones. King Crimson were the opening act. Their setlist was cut for the occasion, and the last track was much shorter than usual. Nonetheless, the consensus was that their performance was a success, which significantly increased the band's reputation.

The CD also includes two bonus tracks. The first is a series of excerpts from a press conference, held by all five members of the original King Crimson along with the band's road management. This conference was recorded at the release of King Crimson's Epitaph box set, featuring four CDs of concert material by the original band. The conference was held at the InterContinental London hotel on March 15, 1997.

The second bonus track is an instrumental recording of "21st Century Schizoid Man", recorded at Morgan Studios in London on June 12, 1969. Guitarist Robert Fripp has acknowledged that his solo on this version is "dismal in extremis", though noting that it was intended only as a guide track (and was subsequently replaced by a "proper" solo).

The album was originally scheduled to be released in August 2000, but was held up by a dispute between members of the 1969 line-up of King Crimson. The liner notes include comments from Fripp, Ian McDonald, Michael Giles, Peter Sinfield and manager David Enthoven.

Track listing
All tracks written by Robert Fripp, Michael Giles, Greg Lake, Ian McDonald and Peter Sinfield, unless otherwise indicated.

Personnel
 Robert Fripp – guitar
 Greg Lake – bass guitar, vocals
 Ian McDonald – saxophone, flute, Mellotron, vocals
 Michael Giles – drums, percussion, vocals
 Peter Sinfield – lyrics and illumination

Production
Produced by Robert Fripp and David Singleton. 
The original live concert was mixed by Peter Sinfield.
Digital editing by Alex Mundy.

2002 live albums
Concerts in Hyde Park, London
King Crimson Collector's Club albums